Jared Gomes (born October 20, 1988) is a Canadian ice hockey player. He is currently an unrestricted free agent.

Playing career
Gomes attended the University of Prince Edward Island where he played in the Atlantic conference of Canadian Interuniversity Sport (CIS). For his outstanding play during the 2009–10 season, Gomes was selected as the 2009–10 CIS Rookie of the Year and was awarded the Clare Drake Award. He was also named to the 2011–12 AUS First All-Star Team. Gomes spent the 2013–14 season with the American Hockey League's San Antonio Rampage.

On October 11, 2014, Gomes signed a professional tryout contract with the Hamilton Bulldogs of the AHL. He was shortly released thereafter, securing his first European contract in signing a one-year deal with the Straubing Tigers of the Deutsche Eishockey Liga on October 16, 2014. In the 2014–15 season, Gomes established a role as a depth forward and contributed with 14 points in 41 games.

On June 3, 2015, Gomes opted to return to the AHL, signing a one-year contract for the 2015–16 season with the Bridgeport Sound Tigers. In 2016–17 season, he played for Italian team Ritten Sport in the Continental Cup until he changed to German second-level league team SC Riessersee in November 2016.

After completing his fifth European season in Germany, Gomes opted to return to North America during the COVID-19 pandemic, signing a contract to return to former club, the Brampton Beast of the ECHL, on September 24, 2020. With the Beast later suspending operations due to the pandemic for the season, Gomes was released as a free agent.

Career statistics

Awards and honours

References

External links

1988 births
Living people
Brampton Beast players
Bridgeport Sound Tigers players
Canadian ice hockey centres
Mississauga St. Michael's Majors players
Ontario Junior Hockey League players
Ravensburg Towerstars players
Rote Teufel Bad Nauheim players
SC Riessersee players
San Antonio Rampage players
Sarnia Sting players
Straubing Tigers players
UPEI Panthers ice hockey players
Canadian expatriate ice hockey players in Germany